The Meridian campaign or Meridian expedition took place from February 3 – March 6, 1864, from Vicksburg, Mississippi to Meridian, Mississippi, by the Union Army of the Tennessee, led by Maj. Gen. William Tecumseh Sherman. Sherman captured Meridian, Mississippi, inflicting heavy damage to it. The campaign is viewed by historians as a prelude to Sherman's March to the Sea (Savannah campaign) in that a large swath of damage and destruction was inflicted on Central Mississippi as Sherman marched across the state and back.

Two supporting columns were under the command of Brigadier General William Sooy Smith and Colonel James Henry Coates. Smith's expedition was tasked to destroy a rebel cavalry commanded by Major General Nathan Bedford Forrest, maintain communications with Middle Tennessee and take men from the defense on the Mississippi River to the Atlanta campaign. To maintain communications, it was to protect the Mobile and Ohio Railroad. Coates' expedition moved up the Yazoo River and for a while occupied Yazoo City, Mississippi.

Background

After the Chattanooga campaign Union forces under Sherman returned to Vicksburg and headed eastward toward Meridian. Meridian was an important railroad center and was home to a Confederate arsenal, military hospital, and prisoner-of-war stockade, as well as the headquarters for a number of state offices.

Sherman planned to take Meridian and, if the situation was favorable, push on to Selma, Alabama.  He also wished to threaten Mobile enough to force the Confederates to reinforce their defenses. While Sherman set out on February 3, 1864, with the main force of 20,000 men from Vicksburg, he ordered Brig. Gen. William Sooy Smith to lead a cavalry force of 7,000 men from Memphis, Tennessee, south through Okolona, Mississippi, along the Mobile and Ohio Railroad to meet the rest of the Union force at Meridian.

March to Meridian

To counter the threat, Confederate President Jefferson Davis ordered troops to the area from other localities. The Confederate commander in the area, Lt. Gen. Leonidas Polk, consolidated a number of commands in and around Morton, Mississippi, but lost his nerve and retreated rapidly eastward. On the journey towards Meridian, Sherman ordered several feints into other regions of the state to keep Polk guessing about Sherman's true point of attack. Sherman also asked Maj. Gen. Nathaniel Banks, Union commander of the Department of the Gulf at New Orleans, Louisiana, to have boats maneuvering as if they were preparing to attack Mobile. Doing this forced the Confederates to keep troops from leaving Mobile to aid Meridian in case of an attack on the gulf. To further confuse Polk, Sherman sent gunboats and infantry up the Yazoo River to divert his attention. Cavalry units commanded by Maj. Gen. Stephen D. Lee periodically skirmished with Sherman's force. As Sherman approached Meridian, he met stiffer resistance from the combined forces but steadily moved on. Polk finally realized that he could not stop Sherman and was convinced he was headed not for Meridian but for Mobile, so he decided to evacuate Meridian on February 14, fall back to Demopolis, Alabama, and prepare to launch a rear attack, leaving Meridian and its surrounding territory to the mercy of the enemy. While evacuating, Polk and his army began removing some railroad rolling stock to McDowell's Bluff.

Smith's troubles
Smith never reached Meridian; he and his troops met Confederate resistance led by Maj. Gen. Nathan Bedford Forrest at West Point, Mississippi. Forrest and his army forced Smith to begin to retreat to Tennessee. When Forrest saw Smith's army retreating, he ordered his troops to chase the army down. Forrest caught Smith and his troops in Okolona, Mississippi, and forced them to retreat more rapidly after a defeat in the Battle of Okolona on February 22, 1864, which ultimately resulted in General Sherman's entire left flank being eliminated during the campaign.

Destruction of Meridian
Sherman's army reached Meridian on February 14, 1864.  Still unaware of Smith's defeat at West Point and the one to come at Okolona, Sherman decided to continue waiting for Smith in Meridian until the morning of February 20, when he gave up and returned to Vicksburg. While he and his army were waiting, Sherman ordered his troops "to wipe the appointed meeting place off the map" by destroying the railroads and burning much of the area to the ground. Sherman's troops destroyed  of railroad, 61 bridges,  of trestle work, 20 locomotives, 28 cars, and 3 steam sawmills. After the troops departed, inhabitants of the city were without food for some days, but the soldiers had not directly inflicted any personal injuries during the attack. After the destruction of the economic and military infrastructure of Meridian, Sherman is reported to have said, "Meridian with its depots, store-houses, arsenal, hospitals, offices, hotels, and cantonments no longer exists."

When Sherman left Meridian, heading west by way of Canton, Mississippi, he was still unaware of Smith's defeats, so he began looking for Smith and his force. He did not discover what happened to Smith until he arrived back at Vicksburg. Sherman had destroyed some important Confederate transportation facilities but was unable to continue into Alabama. In his Memoirs (1885) Sherman denies any intention of going to Mobile: "in the following letter to General Banks, of January 31st, written from Vicksburg before starting for Meridian, it will be seen clearly that I indicated my intention to keep up the delusion of an attack on Mobile by land, whereas I promised him to be back to Vicksburg by the 1st of March . . . ."

Yazoo Expedition
On January 31, 1864, Coates and 947 men from the 11th Illinois Infantry Regiment and 8th Louisiana Infantry Regiment (African Descent) left Vicksburg aboard six river transports and five gunboats. The expedition steamed up the Yazoo River to occupy Yazoo City on February 9. They were joined there by 250 men from the 1st Mississippi Cavalry Regiment (African Descent) and the expedition continued upriver to reach Greenwood, Mississippi, on February 14. Descending the Yazoo River, the expedition returned to Yazoo City on February 28 after seizing over 1,700 bales of cotton. On March 5, Coates' force repulsed an attack by two brigades of Confederate cavalry under Lawrence Sullivan Ross and Robert V. Richardson in the Battle of Yazoo City. Following orders, Coates abandoned Yazoo City on March 6 and returned to Vicksburg.

Timeline
A summary of skirmishes and battles:
February 3: General Sherman’s column left Vicksburg, Mississippi and faced multiple skirmishes at Liverpool Heights 
February 4: at Champion’s Hill, Queen’s Hill, Edwards’ Ferry, and near Bolton Depot
February 5: at Baker’s Creek, Clinton, Jackson
February 6–18: advanced from Memphis, Tennessee to Wyatt, Mississippi
February 6: at Hillsborough. 
February 7: skirmishes at Brandon, Morton, Satartia
February 8: Coldwater Ferry, near Morton; near and at Senatobia
February 9: Yazoo City was occupied by Union forces until March 6.
February 10: skirmishes at Hillsborough, Morton. 
February 11: Brigadier General W. Sooy Smith’s Column advanced from Collierville, Tennessee with further skirmishes at Raiford’s Plantation
February 12: Wall Hill, Holly Springs.
February 13: skirmishes at Wyatt.
February 13–14: skirmishes between Chunky Creek and Meridian.
February 14 to 20: Meridian was occupied by Union forces.
February 15 to 17: Further skirmishes at Marion Station
February 16: Lauderdale Springs.
February 17: skirmish near Pontotoc, Houlka Swamp, 
February 18: skirmish near Okolona, Aberdeen.
February 19: Houston, Egypt Station, near Meridian.
February 20: near West Point.
February 21: Ellis’ Bridge, West Point, Prairie Station, Okolona.
February 21–22: at Union.
February 22: Battle of Okolona, and near Ivey’s Hill, Tallahatchie.
February 23: skirmish near New Albany; skirmish at Tippah River, Canton.
February 25: at Hudsonville.
February 26: near Canton.
February 27: at Madisonville, Sharon.
February 28: at Pearl River, Mississippi.
February 29:  near Canton.
March 2: at Canton, near Yazoo City.
March 3: at Liverpool, Brownsville. General William Tecumseh Sherman’s column arrived at Vicksburg on March 4.
March 5: Yazoo City was attacked and abandoned by Union forces on March 6.

Divisions

The 16th Army Corps was under the command of Major General Stephen A. Hurlbut. The First Division was under the command of Brigadier General James M. Tuttle. It was composed of the First Brigade under Col. William L. McMillen, Second Brigade under Brigadier General Joseph A. Mower, Third Brigade under Col. James L. Geddes, and Artillery under Captain Nelson T. Spoor. The Third Division was under the command of Brigadier General Andrew J. Smith. It was composed of the First Brigade under Col. David Moore, Second Brigade under Col. William T. Shaw, Third Brigade under Col. Edward H. Wolfe and Col. Risdon M. Moore, and Artillery was under Captain James M. Cockefair. The Fourth Division was under the command of Brigadier General James C. Veatch. It was composed of the First Brigade under Col. Milton Montgomery and Second Brigade under Col. James H. Howe.

The 17th Army Corps was under the command of General James B. McPherson. The First Division was composed of the Third Brigade under Brigadier General Alexander Chambers. Third Division was under Brigadier General Mortimer D. Leggett. It was composed of the First Brigade under Brigadier General Manning F. Force, Second Brigade under Col. Benjamin F. Potts, Third Brigade under Brigadier General Jasper A. Maltby and Artillery under Captain William S. Williams. The Fourth Division was under Brigadier General Marcellus M. Crocker. It was composed of the First Brigade under Brigadier General Thomas Kilby Smith, Second Brigade under Col. Cyrus Hall, Third Brigade under Brigadier General Walter Q. Gresham, Artillery under Captain John W. Powell, Cavalry under Col. Edward F. Winslow. 

Smith’s Column was commanded by Brigadier General William Sooy Smith. It was composed of the First Brigade under Col. George E. Waring, Jr., Second Brigade under Lieutenant Col. William P. Hepburn, Third Brigade under Col. Lafayette McCrillis, and the 4th United States under Captain Charles S. Bowman.

Total troops
The 16th Army Corps First Division aggregate 5,558 men, Third Division 6,854 men, and Fourth Division 3,735 men. 17th Army Corps Headquarters aggregate 99 men, First Division 2,329 men, Third Division 8,640 men, Fourth Division 7,641 men, Cavalry 4,215 men. The total aggregate of men present and absent on the Meridian expedition was 38,071 men.

Casualties
The total casualties during the Meridian expedition was 150 during the Okolona battle. The total campaign casualty figures are unknown.

Notes

References
 National Park Service battle description
 CWSAC Report Update

Bibliography

 United States Congress. Congressional Edition, Volume 2873. (U.S. G.P.O., 1891). 
Sherman, William T. Memoirs of General W.T. Sherman.  (March 21, 2014).
Dinges, Bruce J., Leckie, Shirley A. Just and Righteous Cause: Benjamin H. Grierson’s Civil War Memoir. (Southern Illinois University Press, 2008).
National Park Service. Mississippi Civil Wars Battles. https://web.archive.org/web/20170703180045/http://www.legendsofamerica.com/ms-civilwarbattles5.html (March 23, 2014).

Further reading
 Foster, Buck T. Sherman's Mississippi Campaign. Tuscaloosa: University of Alabama Press, 2006. .

External links
Mississippi History Now

Military operations of the American Civil War in Mississippi
Meridian
Meridian
Meridian
Meridian, Mississippi
Lauderdale County, Mississippi
Meridian
1864 in Mississippi
February 1864 events